A harpoon reaction is a type of chemical reaction, first proposed by Michael Polanyi in 1920, whose mechanism (also called the harpooning mechanism) involves two neutral reactants undergoing an electron transfer over a relatively long distance to form ions that then attract each other closer together. For example, a metal atom and a halogen might react to form a cation and anion, respectively, leading to a combined metal halide.

The main feature of these redox reactions is that, unlike most reactions, they have steric factors greater than unity; that is, they take place faster than predicted by collision theory. This is explained by the fact that the colliding particles have greater cross sections than the pure geometrical ones calculated from their radii, because when the particles are close enough, an electron "jumps" (therefore the name) from one of the particles to the other one, forming an anion and a cation which subsequently attract each other. Harpoon reactions usually take place in the gas phase, but they are also possible in condensed media.

The predicted rate constant can be improved by using a better estimation of the steric factor. A rough approximation is that the largest separation Rx at which charge transfer can take place on energetic grounds, can be estimated from the solution of the following equation that determines the largest distance at which the Coulombic attraction between the two oppositely charged ions is sufficient to provide the energy ΔE0

With , where Ei is the ionization potential of the metal and Eea is the electron affinity of the halogen.

Examples of harpoon reactions
 Generically: Rg + X2 + hν → RgX + X, where Rg is a rare gas and X is a halogen
 Ba...FCH3 + hν → BaF(*) + CH3
K + CH3I → KI + CH3

References

Chemical kinetics
Chemical reactions
Reaction mechanisms